Swettenham Hall is a country house standing to the southeast of the village of Swettenham, Cheshire, England.  It dates from the 17th century and was remodelled in the 19th century.  The house is constructed in pebbledashed brick on a stone plinth with a slate roof.  It has a symmetrical façade in seven bays.  The central bay has a single-storey canted bay window, and the second and sixth bays have two-storey canted bay windows.  All the windows are sashes.  At the rear of the house is a large three-bay canted bay window containing three pairs of French windows, above which are gables.  The house is recorded in the National Heritage List for England as a designated Grade II listed building.  Also listed at Grade II is a range of farm buildings to the east of the hall dating from the middle of the 18th century, and a private chapel to the northwest of the hall built in 1852.

See also

Listed buildings in Swettenham

References

Houses completed in the 17th century
Country houses in Cheshire
Grade II listed buildings in Cheshire
Grade II listed houses